Dorothea Hindmarch (4 June 1918 – 20 September 2001), also known as Thea March, was an English champion player of billiards, and snooker player. She won the equivalent of the women's world billiards title three times, in 1962, 1967 and 1969.

Biography
Hindmarch was born on 4 June 1918. During World War II, Hindmarch was a corporal in the Auxiliary Territorial Service, leading a small team involved in radar location in South Wales.

Hindmarch won the London and Home Counties division of the Ladies' snooker championship in 1959, and for six years consecutively from 1965 to 1970. She also won the Southern Counties championship for four consecutive years from 1966. In English Billiards, Hindmarch was five times London and Home Counties champion, including from 1967 to 1969.

Hindmarch won the Women's Billiards Championship in 1962, winning a three-hour final against Rae Craven 438–385. She won a second title five years later, in 1967, and a third in 1969, beating Vera Selby 452–409 in the final.

In the 1971–1972 season, Rae Craven and Hindmarch became the first women to enter the English Amateur Snooker championship. Hindmarch served as the Secretary of the Women's Billiards Association, and in that capacity was a member of the Billiards and Snooker Control Council.

Hindmarch worked as an Inspector of Taxes. She died in Bromley on 20 September 2001, at the age of 83.

Career Highlights

Notes

References

External links
World Ladies Billiards Champions  World Billiards

1918 births
2001 deaths
English snooker players
Female snooker players
English players of English billiards
Female players of English billiards
World champions in English billiards